The 2007–08 Scottish Football League Third Division was the 13th season in the format of ten teams in the fourth-tier of Scottish football. The season started on 4 August 2007 and ended on 26 April 2008. East Fife F.C. finished top and were promoted alongside Arbroath F.C. as play-off winners. Stranraer F.C. were also promoted due to Gretna being demoted to the Third Division.

Teams for 2007–08

Berwick Rangers as champions of the 2006–07 season were directly promoted to the 2007–08 Scottish Second Division. They were replaced by Forfar Athletic who finished bottom of the 2006–07 Scottish Second Division.

A second promotion place was available via a play-off tournament between the ninth-placed team of the 2006–07 Scottish Second Division, Stranraer, and the sides ranked second, third and fourth in the 2006–07 Scottish Third Division, Arbroath, Queen's Park and East Fife respectively. The play-off was won by Queen's Park who defeated East Fife in the final. Stranraer were therefore relegated.

Overview
Relegated from Second Division to Third Division
 Forfar Athletic
 Stranraer (via play-offs)

Promoted from Third Division to Second Division
 Berwick Rangers
 Queens Park (via play-offs)

Stadia and attendances

Source: The League Insider

Managerial changes

Table

Results
Teams play each other four times in this league. In the first half of the season each team plays every other team twice (home and away) and then do the same in the second half of the season.

First half of season

Second half of season

Top scorers

Source: The League Insider

Events

15 March:  East Fife confirm their promotion to the Second Division as Third Division champions with a 3–0 victory over East Stirlingshire, becoming the first team in Britain to win a league trophy in the 2007–08 season.

29 March: Berwick Rangers are relegated from the Second Division after a 2–2 draw with Peterhead.
10 May: Arbroath are promoted to the Second Division after a 2–1 aggregate win over Stranraer in the Second Division play-off final. Cowdenbeath, who were beaten by Arbroath in the semi-finals, are relegated to the Third Division.
29 May: Second Division play-off runners-up Stranraer are promoted to the Second Division following Gretna's demotion to the Third Division.

Monthly awards

Second Division play-offs

References

Scottish Third Division seasons
3
4
Scot